This list of Alpha Kappa Alpha sorors (commonly referred to as AKAs) includes initiated and honorary members of Alpha Kappa Alpha (ΑΚΑ), the first inter-collegiate Greek-letter sorority established for Black college women.

Alpha Kappa Alpha Sorority was founded on January 15, 1908, at Howard University in Washington, D.C., by nine women who were known as The Original Group of 1908, and seven sophomores, who were accepted as honor initiates and are known as The Sophomores of 1910.

Alpha Kappa Alpha has a membership of more than 200,000 women in over 950 chapters in the United States and several other countries. Membership is extended to female college undergraduate and graduate students. The sorority also bestows honorary membership as its highest honor.

List

Listed below are notable Alpha Kappa Alpha women such as the founders and international presidents, and members who are involved in the fields of arts and entertainment, business, civil rights, education, health, law, politics, science, literature and sports.

Arts and entertainment

Artists and illustrators

Actresses

Authors

Dancers

Filmmakers and producers

Miss America, Mrs. America, Miss USA, Miss Black USA Pageant and other pageant titleholders

Singers, musicians, music business

Television

Civil rights

Education

Health and science
{{Mem/fstart
|ilist =

|alist=

Judges

Political figures

Humanitarian and social causes

Non-elected officials

U.S. politicians

World leaders

Religion

Sports

Other

Citations

References

External links

 Alpha Kappa Alpha Sorority, Incorporated
 Honorary Members of Alpha Kappa Alpha Sorority, Incorporated
 Honoring the Past: Alpha Kappa Alpha Founders
 Centennial Celebration: Founders
 Alpha Kappa Alpha Authors
 Political Graveyard's List of Alpha Kappa Alpha Politicians

sisters
Lists of members of United States student societies
Lists of African-American people